The MS Morska Wola, (previously Consul Horn, Hindhead and Rio Negro), was a Polish freighter during the Second World War. She was purchased in Norway by the Polish shipping company Gdynia America Line and named after a Polish emigrants settlement in Brazil.

Origins
The ship was built as Consul Horn in Kiel in 1924 by Friedrich Krupp AG for the HC Horn shipping company, which operated her out of Hamburg. On 31 December 1927 the ship ran aground on Ven, Sweden. She was refloated on 4 January 1928.

In 1934 she was acquired by the Knoll Shipping Company, registered in London and renamed as Hindhead. She was then acquired by A/S Sobral in 1936 and renamed Rio Negro, operating on shipping routes between Norway and South America. In 1938 she was acquired by the Polish shipping company Gdynia America Line, renamed as the Morska Wola and based in Gdynia.

World War II
In 1940, during the final days of the Battle of France, MS Morska Wola was in port in France, from which she escaped to the United Kingdom. She was then put to use in Northern Atlantic convoys. She took part in over 40 convoys, most notably, she was one of the ships who managed to escape, after the German heavy cruiser  attacked convoy HX 84, thanks to the delaying action fought by the armed merchant cruiser . She returned to Poland at end of the war, operating on shipping routes to South America and the Levant.

Post war
In 1952 she was taken over by the Dalmor fishing company and converted to supply ship for fishing boats operating in the North Sea. As such she had capacity of 150 people. After six years of such work, she was crippled by damage and judged unworthy of repair. She was scrapped in 1959.

References

1924 ships
Ships built in Kiel
Merchant ships of Germany
Merchant ships of the United Kingdom
Merchant ships of Norway
Maritime incidents in 1927
World War II merchant ships of Poland
Ships of the Gdynia-America Line